Émile Augustin Cyprien Driant (11 September 1855 – 22 February 1916) was a French writer, politician, and army officer. He was the first high-ranking casualty of the Battle of Verdun during World War I.

Biography

Born at Neufchâtel-sur-Aisne in the Picardy region, Driant graduated from the Saint-Cyr military academy and became an Army officer in 1877. Appointed to infantry, he joined the 4th Regiment of Zouaves in North Africa as a Captain in 1886. In 1888 Driant married the daughter of nationalist General Boulanger. He spent the years 1892–1896 as an instructor at the Saint-Cyr military academy, and from 1899–1905 commanded the 1st Battalion of Chasseurs.

He resigned his commission in 1906, as he was banned from achieving higher rank due to his controversial father-in-law and by his strong nationalist and Catholic sentiments. He devoted his time to journalism and politics and was elected to the Chamber of Deputies as a representative for Nancy in 1910. Driant devoted his efforts to strengthening France's defenses.

Writing
In 1888 Driant began writing his first guerre imaginaire ("imaginary war") novel, which he was to publish using the pseudonym "Capitaine Danrit".

Driant gave his readers heroic episodes, great victories over the Germans, and in the 1192 pages of his  ("The Fatal War: France-England", 1902), the total defeat of the British by the French.

Driant possibly wrote more future-war novels than any other writer before 1914. He published so much fiction, and his stories were so long, that half a century later Pierre Versins said in his  (1972) that the hundred pages of Chesney's Battle of Dorking were much more important and revealing "than the thousands of white pages soiled day after day by a national hero of France" (Driant had a postage stamp dedicated to him in 1956, Scott #788, Yvert et Tellier #1052).

World War I

Soon after the beginning of World War I in 1914, Driant was recalled to the Army as a captain. He was promoted to lieutenant colonel and given command of two infantry battalions, the 56th and 59th chasseurs reservists battalions. He still kept his seat in Parliament and was, among other things, involved in the drafting of the legislation to create the Croix de Guerre.

In December 1915, he criticised Joseph Joffre for removing artillery guns and infantry from fortresses around Toul and Verdun in order to strengthen other areas of the now-deadlocked Western Front. Despite the support of the Minister for War Joseph Gallieni, no troops or guns were returned. What were supposed to be formidable defences were reduced to a small number of guns and soldiers to man them. Driant claimed that the area was threatened; Joffre denied this.

Driant was proved right on 21 February 1916, when the German Army initiated a massive attack on French forces in the Verdun sector. As the French defences crumbled all around them, Driant's two battalions – 1,200 men in total – began a desperate defence of the Bois des Caures in Flabas. Under his command, the battalions managed to resist the German onslaught until the afternoon of the next day, helping to gain the time that the French High Command needed to rush troops to the threatened sector. When his battalions were outflanked and the position was untenable, Driant ordered the survivors to withdraw. During the withdrawal, he was killed. He was regarded as a hero among the French at the time, and he and his men are still commemorated at a ceremony on 21 February every year.

He was buried initially by the Germans, who also wrote to his widow (via Switzerland) to assure her that he had been accorded full military honours. He was re-interred by the French where he fell in the Bois des Caures, where a memorial now stands to him and his men.

Bibliography
A selection of books by the author:

Notes

References 
, in French

 Angeletti Ferdinando, (2016) Emile Driant/CapitaineDanrit – Tra futurologia e politica militare in Future Wars Quaderno della Società Italiana di Storia Militare

External links
http://www.webmatters.net/france/ww1_verdun_driant.htm
France at War – Emile Driant: First Hero of Verdun at www.worldwar1.com

1855 births
1916 deaths
People from Aisne
Politicians from Hauts-de-France
Popular Liberal Action politicians
Members of the 10th Chamber of Deputies of the French Third Republic
Members of the 11th Chamber of Deputies of the French Third Republic
French nationalists
Driant, Emile Augustin Cyprien
French male novelists
French military personnel killed in World War I